Senna Ušić Jogunica (born 14 May 1986) is a Croatian volleyball player. She is a member of the Croatia women's national volleyball team and played for Eczacıbaşı Istanbul in 2014.

Career
She was part of the Croatian national team at the 2010 FIVB Volleyball Women's World Championship in Japan. at the 2014 FIVB Volleyball Women's World Championship in Italy, and at the 2015 FIVB World Grand Prix.

Ušić-Jogunica took part in the 2003 Youth European champion and was 2004 Croatian national cup champion with Ok Azena. With Pallavolo Sirio Perugia, she won the 2005 CEV European Champions League, 2005 Italian national cup, 2006 Italian supercup, 2006 Italian national cup, 2006 Italian national championship serie A1 and the 2006 CEV Cup.

In 2009 she won the Mediterranean Games bronze medal with the Croatian national team. With Scavollini Pesaro she won the 2010 Italian super cup and the 2010 Italian national championship serie A1. She then played with the Turkish club Eczacibasi Istanbul, winning the 2011 Turkish national supercup winner and the 2012 Turkish national cup and the 2012 Turkish national championship. She moved to China, and played with Shanghai Volleyball, winning with this team the 2014 Chinese national championship division second place and the 2015 Chinese national championship bronze medal.

Clubs
  AZENA Velika Gorica (1997–2005)
  Sirio Perugia (2005–2007)
  Pioneer Red Wings (2007–2008)
  Pallavolo Cesena (2008–2009)
  Scavolini Pesaro (2009–2011)
  Eczacıbaşı Istanbul (2011–2014)
  Shanghai (2014–2015)
  Pallavolo Scandicci (feb 2015–May 2015)
  Shanghai (2015–2016)

References

External links
 Senna Ušić Jogunica at the International Volleyball Federation
 
 Senna Ušić Jogunica at WorldofVolley

1986 births
Living people
Croatian women's volleyball players
Place of birth missing (living people)
Volleyball players at the 2015 European Games
European Games competitors for Croatia
Outside hitters
Eczacıbaşı volleyball players
Croatian expatriate sportspeople in Italy
Croatian expatriate sportspeople in Japan
Croatian expatriate sportspeople in Turkey
Croatian expatriate sportspeople in China
Croatian expatriate volleyball players
Expatriate volleyball players in Italy
Expatriate volleyball players in Japan
Expatriate volleyball players in Turkey
Expatriate volleyball players in China
Mediterranean Games medalists in volleyball
Mediterranean Games bronze medalists for Croatia
Competitors at the 2009 Mediterranean Games
21st-century Croatian women